Community archives are archives created or accumulated, described, and/or preserved by individuals and community groups who desire to document their cultural heritage based on shared experiences, interests, and/or identities, sometimes without the traditional intervention of formally trained archivists, historians, and librarians. Instead, the engaged community members determine the scope and contents of the community archive, often with a focus on a significant shared event, such as the Ferguson unrest (2014). Community archives are created in response to needs defined by the members of a community, who may also exert control over how materials are used.

Although local and regional societies, churches, and museums have collected community records for generations, community archives increased in number and popularity throughout the 1970s and 1980s, which Anne Gilliland and Andrew Flinn believe may be due in part to increased interest in oral history and community representation in response to the emerging anti-war, anti-establishment, civil rights, and student activism movements of the 1960s.

The work of community archives received little recognition from archival scholars until the early 2000s, when several published studies explored the relationships between communities, archives, and collective memory. Jeannette Bastian’s Owning Memory: How a Caribbean Community Lost Its Archives and Found Its History is considered to be one of the most significant of these publications. Bastian discusses the experience of the people of the U.S. Virgin Islands and Virgin Islanders' efforts to rebuild their “house of memory” after losing local control of nearly all governmental documents and records to their historical and current colonial rulers. Bastian's work introduces several key concepts, including the notion of a "community of records" to acknowledge that communities are entities that both create records and whose input is needed to contextualize the records they create.

Methods 
Community archives may be developed via participatory or autonomous practices, and can occur in both physical and virtual spaces, including through the digitization of dispersed physical materials. The participatory archives model was defined by Isto Huvila in 2008 to discuss how individuals actively and consciously participate in the creation of shared heritage. Drawing on the idea of participatory culture (as opposed to consumer culture), the participatory collection's focus is to create opportunities for civic engagement and artistic expression, encouraging participants to share information and resources with the community to achieve a common goal. The autonomous archives framework was introduced in 2010 by Shauna Moore and Susan Pell to describe community-based collections that are constituted as intentional social and political acts by and for emerging publics, often enacted by those who have been traditionally excluded from the dominant cultural discourse.

The act of bringing together dispersed records online, also called “virtual reunification,” may encourage a more holistic understating of community history and strengthen community ties. However, communities that cannot support these endeavors on their own but wish to remain autonomous may face added complexity, due to the technological infrastructure required to ensure that collections are developed on a platform that can be supported and maintained over time.

Challenges 
As the term "community archive" has gained popularity, it has been applied in a variety of ways, including as a way to denote community participation in knowledge creation and preservation in ways that may challenge existing dominant historical and political narratives. However, the ambiguity inherent in defining the terms "community" and "archives" complicates attempts to discuss and define what is meant by "community archives". Therefore, allowing these independent entities to label and define their organizations and missions is one important way to support their activities.

Whether community archives consider their endeavors to be political, exerting control over community documentation and storytelling inherently calls attention to issues of power manifest in traditional approaches to archival creation and maintenance. As the interest in, and number of, community archives increase globally, opportunities to document and share these efforts and materials with the general public may result in tension between community archives stakeholders and heritage professionals who are trained with an emphasis on legal, intellectual, and physical control of records.

Since many community archives develop as independent social spaces, often distinct from mainstream narratives, their organizational champions may resist archival labels and/or intervention by trained professionals out of concern that collections may be absorbed by formal institutions and  rendered inaccessible to their communities. Therefore, issues of independence and autonomy tend to be at the forefront of community archival identities, even if they seek partnerships or welcome support from traditional cultural heritage institutions.

References

Archives by type